

Ealhhun or Alhhun was a medieval Bishop of Worcester. He was consecrated between either 843 or December 844 and November 845. He died between 869 and 872.

Citations

References

External links
 

Bishops of Worcester
9th-century English bishops
Year of birth unknown
Year of death unknown